WMNX (97.3 FM) is a mainstream urban formatted broadcast radio station licensed to Wilmington, North Carolina and serving the Wilmington Metro area.

History
97.3 started in 1970 as WHSL-FM, sister station to AM 1490 WHSL. In the early 1980s, album-oriented rock WHSL was launched.  In the late 1980s, WHSL shifted to soft adult contemporary music during the day and smooth jazz in the evening, with calls WMFD-FM and later WMNX.  In 1992, it switched to mainstream urban and began using the branding "Coast 97.3".  In 1999, Cape Fear Broadcasting announced the sale of its six stations to Cumulus Broadcasting. The sale was challenged by Ocean Broadcasting of Wilmington because it would give Cumulus 6 FMs and an AM in Wilmington, and about 55 percent of market revenue.  Today, WMNX airs a mainstream urban format.

References

External links
Official Website 

MNX
Radio stations established in 1970
Urban contemporary radio stations in the United States
Cumulus Media radio stations